Tingena pallidula is a species of moth in the family Oecophoridae. It is endemic to New Zealand and has been collected in the Nelson and Tasman regions. Adults of this species are on the wing in February and have been collected by beating undergrowth.

Taxonomy
This species was described by Alfred Philpott in 1924 and named Borkhausenia pallidula using specimens collected at Gouland Downs on the Kahurangi National Park in February.  George Hudson discussed this species in his 1928 book The butterflies and moths of New Zealand under that name. In 1988 J. S. Dugdale placed this species in the genus Tingena. The male holotype specimen is held in the New Zealand Arthropod Collection.

Description

Philpott described this species as follows:

Distribution 

This species is endemic to New Zealand and has been observed in the Nelson and Taman districts.

Behaviour
Adults of this species are on the wing in February and have been collected by beating undergrowth.

References

Oecophoridae
Moths of New Zealand
Moths described in 1924
Endemic fauna of New Zealand
Taxa named by Alfred Philpott
Endemic moths of New Zealand